Code page 912 (CCSID 912) (also known as CP 912, IBM 00912) is a code page used under IBM AIX and DOS to write the Albanian, Bosnian, Croatian, Czech, English, German, Hungarian, Polish, Romanian, Serbian (Latin alphabet), Slovak, and Slovene languages. It is an extension of ISO/IEC 8859-2.

Code page layout
In the following table characters are shown together with their corresponding Unicode code points. Only the second half is shown, code points 0-127 are the same as code page 437.

References

912
912